Jagwal was the first Garhwali movie made in 1983 by Parasar Gaur. Jagwal is a Garhwali word which means 'the long wait'. 
It is a family melodrama that revolves around the story of a young woman.

Plot
The story goes like this: a young wife had to wait seven years for her husband as he is arrested and sentenced for murder charges. This happened immediately after their marriage. Her husband advises her to marry his younger brother or run away from home. However, she refuses to follow her husband's advise and decides to wait for him.

See also
Suberau Ghaam, 2014 Garhwali language film

References

External links

Garhwali films
Garhwal division